Åkra Church is a parish church of the Church of Norway in Karmøy Municipality in Rogaland county, Norway. It is located in the town of Åkrehamn on the western coast of the island of Karmøy. It is the main church for the Åkra parish which is part of the Karmøy prosti (deanery) in the Diocese of Stavanger. The modern-looking, white, brick church was built in a rectangular design in 1985 using designs by the architect Børge Brandsberg-Dahl.

The church was consecrated on 10 November 1985 by the Bishop Sigurd Lunde. The  church seats about 430 people in the main sanctuary, but it can be expanded to more if needed.

See also
List of churches in Rogaland

References

Karmøy
Churches in Rogaland
Brick churches in Norway
20th-century Church of Norway church buildings
Churches completed in 1985
1985 establishments in Norway